The Chinese Elm cultivar Ulmus parvifolia 'Taiwan' is a small, evergreen tree from Taiwan .

Description
The clone is characterized by thin and delicate stems, giving it a very graceful appearance.

Pests and diseases
The species and its cultivars are highly resistant, but not immune, to Dutch elm disease, and unaffected by the Elm Leaf Beetle Xanthogaleruca luteola.

Cultivation
Intended for bonsai use only, 'Taiwan' is not known to have been introduced to Europe or Australasia.

Accessions
None known.

Nurseries

North America

Miniature Plant Kingdom, Sebastopol, Sonoma County, California, US.

References

Chinese elm cultivar
Ulmus articles missing images
Ulmus